Maharajadhiraj Mirza Maharao Shri Deshalji II Sahib Bahadur (b 1814- d 1860) (reign: 1819–1860) was the Rao of Cutch belonging to Jadeja dynasty, who ascended the throne of Princely State of Cutch upon deposition of his father Bharmalji II by British. He reigned during his minority, under a Council of Regency, headed by Captain MacMurdo and composed of Jadeja chiefs.

Reign
During his reign Kutch suffered a severe earthquake in 1819 followed by severe famine in 1823, 1825 & 1832. Further, Kutch was attacked by marauding band from Sindh. Rao Deshalji and his Dewan Devkaran with their mediocre power and the support of their brethren defeated Kesarkhan and Sher Bulandkhan the Muslim marauding band.

Deshalji although 18 years of age took the management of law in his own hands. The trade with Africa especially Zanzibar improved significantly. Slowly and steadily the industrialization in Kutch got a setback which was started by Lakhpatji and Godji. In the period of Deshalji II steps were taken to suppress infanticide, sati and the slave trade in the State. The educational system was also improved.

Family and Succession
He had eight wives and several sons of which Pragmalji II was declared Yuvraj by him, who ascended the throne after his death in 1860.  One of his queens is responsible for erection of present-day temples at Narayan Sarovar. Rao Deshalji II came of age in 1834 and was invested with full ruling powers but in later life, due to ill health, he transferred his ruling power to his son & successor Pragmalji II in 1859 one year before his death.

References

External links

1814 births
1860 deaths
Maharajas of Kutch
Hindu monarchs
Gujarati people